José Fernando Viana de Santana (born 27 March 1987), commonly known as Fernandão, is a Brazilian footballer who last played as a striker for Goiás.

After a journeyman career in his homeland, he had a five-year spell in Turkish football with Bursaspor and Fenerbahçe, totalling 93 games and 49 goals in the Süper Lig. With the former in 2014–15, he was the league's top scorer with 22 goals.

Career

Brazil
Fernandão started his career with America-RJ in 2006. In 2008, he was signed by Tombense, a proxy club for the investor. He was loaned to Flamengo in September.

Fernandão played for Volta Redonda in 2009 Campeonato Carioca. In 2010, he left for Macaé Esporte Futebol Clube.

In August 2010 he was signed by Paysandu Sport Club for 2010 Campeonato Brasileiro Série C. In January 2011 he was signed by Democrata de Governador Valadares for 2011 Campeonato Mineiro. He signed a seven-month contract with Guarani on 19 May 2011, but soon departed to Palmeiras, on 26 August 2011. Fernandão's first appearance for Palmeiras came in the derby against Corinthians on 28 August 2011, where he came as a substitute at half time and scored 7 minutes later giving Palmeiras an important 2-1 victory.

Bursaspor

In January 2014, Fernandão joined Turkish Süper Lig team Bursaspor on loan, and he scored two goals on his debut match against Eskişehirspor which Bursaspor won 3–1 at Bursa Atatürk Stadium.

In the 2014–15 season, he finished the campaign as the league's top scorer with 22 goals. He also netted on 22 May 2015 as Bursaspor came from behind to win their Turkish Cup semi-final against Fenerbahçe at the Şükrü Saracoğlu Stadium. Twelve days later as they hosted the final against league champions Galatasaray, Fernandão opened the scoring after Alex Telles conceded a penalty in the 25th minute, but Bursaspor lost 3–2.

Fenerbahçe 
On 25 June 2015, Fenerbahçe agreed to sign Fernandão on a four-year deal. On 28 July, he made his club debut against Shakhtar Donetsk in a UEFA Champions League qualifying play-off game. His league debut was on 14 August, during which he scored the second goal from the edge of the penalty area in a 2–0 win at Eskişehirspor.

Al-Wehda
On 12 June 2018, Fernandão signed a two-year deal with Al-Wehda Club of the Saudi Professional League, with the option of a third year. He was brought in by Brazilian manager Fábio Carille, who enlisted several other compatriots into the squad.

Career statistics

Club
.

Honours

Club
Flamengo
Campeonato Carioca: 2008

Palmeiras
Copa do Brasil: 2012

Bahia
Campeonato Baiano: 2019

Individual
Süper Lig Top Scorer: 2014–15 (22 goals)

References

External links

 
 
 

1987 births
Living people
Footballers from Rio de Janeiro (city)
Brazilian footballers
Association football forwards
Campeonato Brasileiro Série A players
Campeonato Brasileiro Série B players
Campeonato Brasileiro Série C players
America Football Club (RJ) players
Tombense Futebol Clube players
CR Flamengo footballers
Volta Redonda FC players
Macaé Esporte Futebol Clube players
Paysandu Sport Club players
Guarani FC players
Sociedade Esportiva Palmeiras players
Club Athletico Paranaense players
Esporte Clube Bahia players
Süper Lig players
Bursaspor footballers
Fenerbahçe S.K. footballers
Saudi Professional League players
Al-Wehda Club (Mecca) players
Brazilian expatriate footballers
Brazilian expatriate sportspeople in Turkey
Brazilian expatriate sportspeople in Saudi Arabia
Expatriate footballers in Turkey
Expatriate footballers in Saudi Arabia